In mathematics, stratified Morse theory is an analogue to Morse theory for general stratified spaces, originally developed by Mark Goresky and  Robert MacPherson.  The main point of the theory is to consider functions  and consider how the stratified space  changes as the real number  changes.  Morse theory of stratified spaces has uses everywhere from pure mathematics topics such as braid groups and representations to robot motion planning and potential theory. A popular application in pure mathematics is Morse theory on manifolds with boundary, and manifolds with corners.

See also

 Digital Morse theory
 Discrete Morse theory
 Level-set method

References

 DJVU file on Goresky's page 

Generalized manifolds
Morse theory
Singularity theory
Stratifications